Zero to Infinity (02∞) is the tenth studio album by Gong and the seventh album by the Daevid Allen version of the group, released in 2000. Like their 1992 album Shapeshifter, it continues the Gong mythology, the central part of which was formed with the Radio Gnome Trilogy of albums, comprising Flying Teapot in 1973, followed by Angel's Egg, 1973, and You in 1974.

Zero the Hero died on Shapeshifter. Zero to Infinity sees his spirit enjoying a body-free and virtual existence. During the course of this he becomes an android spheroid Zeroid. With the help of a strange animal called a gongalope, he learns that all the wisdom of the world exists within him and practices Lafta yoga and tea making. At the end he becomes one with an Invisible Temple and has much fun.

Track listing
 "Foolefare" (Allen, Travis) − 0:42
 "Magdalene" (Allen, Howlett, Malherbe, Taylor) − 3:58
 "The Invisible Temple" (Allen, Howlett, Malherbe, Smyth, Taylor, Travis) − 11:35
 "Zeroid" (Allen, Howlett, Smyth) − 6:08
 "Wise Man in Your Heart" (Allen, Howlett, Pierre Moerlen) − 8:04
 "The Mad Monk" (Allen, Howlett, Taylor, Travis) − 3:25
 "Yoni on Mars" (Smyth, Travis) − 6:07
 "Damaged Man" (Allen, Howlett, Taylor, Travis) − 5:13
 "Bodilingus "(Allen, Howlett, Taylor, Travis) − 4:03
 "Tali's Song" (Allen) − 6:25
 "Infinitea" (Allen, Howlett, Smyth, Taylor, Travis) − 7:48

Personnel
Gong
Daevid Allen − Guitar, Piano, Guitar (Electric), Vocals, Artwork, Electronics
Mike Howlett − Bass, Guitar (Electric)
Didier Malherbe − Sax (Alto), Doudouk, Bamboo Flute
Gilli Smyth − Vocals, Space Whisper, Bird Calls
Chris Taylor − Percussion, Drums, Cowbell
Theo Travis  − Organ, Flute, Keyboards, Sax (Soprano), Sax (Tenor), Theremin, Electronics, Drones, Loop
Guest
Mark Robson − Keyboards, Background Vocals

References

External links
Planet Gong: Tribal: Lyrics: Zero to Infinity
Review at www.aural-innovations.com

2000 albums
Concept albums
Gong (band) albums
Jazz albums by British artists
Progressive rock albums by British artists
Snapper Music albums